Uspomena na vreme koje se sigurno ponoviti neće (Eng. A memory of a time that will surely not come again) is a double album of  Zvonko Bogdan, Croatian/Bunjevac singer from Vojvodina, Serbia. It was released in 2004 at the Vojvodina Sound record label. In Croatia it was released under the Hit Records  label.

Track listing

Disc one
 "Kad sam bio mlađan lovac ja"
 "Ta tvoja suknja plava"
 "Što se bore misli moje"
 "Ljubio sam crno oko"
 "Jesen stiže dunjo moja"
 "U tom Somboru"
 "Ja nekoga volim i nekoga ljubim"
 "Bunjevačko prelo"
 "Živim život ko skitnica"
 "Žabaljka"
 "Tera Lenka"
 "Ko te ima taj te nema"
 "Kupiću ti cipelice"
 "Ženio se stari Cigan"
 "Aj aj aj aj aj"
 "Cele noći ladovina"
 "On je majko bekrija"
 "Osam tamburaša"
 "Evo banke"
 "Nema lepše devojke"
21 "Večernji zvon"

Disc two
 "Prošle su mnoge ljubavi"
 "Šta li radi moja ljubav"
 "Doći ću ti ko u staroj pismi"
 "Život teče u laganom ritmu"
 "Spušta se noć na ravni Srem"
 "Kradem ti se"
 "Od danas te draga više ljubit neću"
 "Ah moj Doro"
 "Čekala me moja draga"
 "Leptirići Mali"
 "Kada moja mladost prođe"
 "Srdo moja"
 "Vino piju"
 "Malo ja malo ti"
 "Ej mati mati mati"
 "šta će selo kad ne bude mene"
 "Ciganski uranak"
 "Čičino kolo"
 "Gde da idem"
 "Crveno cveće"
 "Harem"

Credits 
 Zvonko Bogdan - vocals
 Orkestar Mileta Nikolića (Orchestra of Mile Nikolić)  
 Orkestar Hajo (tamburitza band of ethnic Croatians from Subotica)

2004 albums
Zvonko Bogdan albums